Jess Cramp is an American marine biologist and shark researcher. She is the founder of Sharks Pacific, a non-profit research, policy, and outreach organization that is focused on compiling and providing data collected during expeditions on sharks and rays in the Cook Islands. The data her team collects are used to establish baselines around species distribution and population size. This information is crucial for researchers who are trying to measure changes and impacts to marine habitats over space and time.

Research 
Cramp specializes in conservation policy and engaging communities in ocean management. She was instrumental in the community campaign that resulted in the Cook Islands Shark Sanctuary. This is the largest shark sanctuary in the world.

In 2017, Cramp was awarded a grant on "Evaluating the effectiveness of large-scale marine reserves on highly migratory sharks" by National Geographic.

Awards and honors 

 AAAS IF/THEN Ambassador, 2019
 National Geographic Emerging Explorer, 2015

References 

Living people
American marine biologists
Women marine biologists
James Cook University alumni
Year of birth missing (living people)